Jinhua is a prefecture-level city in central Zhejiang province, People's Republic of China.

Jinhua may also refer to:

 Jinhua (given name), a unisex Chinese given name
 Jin Chinese, a subdivision of spoken Chinese
 Jinhua Railway Station, (both CRH and China Railway) in Jinhua, Zhejiang

Subdistricts 
 Jinhua Subdistrict, Guangzhou, subdivision of Liwan District, Guangzhou, Guangdong
 Jinhua Subdistrict, Chishui, subdivision of Chishui City, Guizhou
 Jinhua Subdistrict, Gaoyang County, subdivision of Gaoyang County, Hebei
 Jinhua Subdistrict, Da'an, Jilin, subdivision of Da'an, Jilin
 Jinhua Subdistrict, Jinzhong, subdivision of Yuci District, Jinzhong, Shanxi

Towns 
 Jinhua, Mianzhu (zh), subdivision of Mianzhu, Sichuan
Written as ""
 Jinhua, Guiyang (zh), subdivision of Wudang District, Guiyang, Guizhou
 Jinhua, Shehong County (zh), subdivision of Shehong County, Sichuan
 Jinhua, Xinjin County (zh), subdivision of Xinjin County, Sichuan
 Jinhua, Yunnan(zh), subdivision of Jianchuan County, Yunnan

Written as ""
 Jinhua, Fengyang County (zh), subdivision of Fengyang County, Guizhou
 Jinhua, Meihekou (zh), subdivision of Meihekou, Jilin
 Jinhua, Hangzhou (zh), subdivision of Xiaoshan District, Hangzhou, Zhejiang

Townships 
Written as ""
 Jinhua Township, Henan (zh), subdivision of Wancheng District, Nanyang, Henan
 Jinhua Township, Jilin (zh), subdivision of Changbai County, Jilin

Written as ""
 Jinhua Township, Rong County, Sichuan (zh), subdivision of Rong County, Sichuan
 Jinhua Township, Meishan (zh), subdivision of Dongpo District, Meishan, Sichuan